The Pikes Peak or Bust Rodeo is a rodeo that takes place in Colorado Springs, Colorado, United States every July. It was  sanctioned by the Professional Rodeo Cowboys Association (PRCA) for many years. However, from 2014 to 2017, it was unsanctioned. Since 2018, it is once again sanctioned by the PRCA. The rodeo dates back to 1937. In 2008, it was inducted into the ProRodeo Hall of Fame in Colorado Springs, Colorado.

In 1923, the journalist and university professor Elmo Scott Watson, former staff writer for Colorado Springs Gazette and Telegraph, met the old-time cowboy Frank H. Maynard, who was working as a nightwatchman at the rodeo. Watson's article on Maynard, published in 1924, brought national attention to both men.

The rodeo went on hiatus from 1942 to 1945 because of World War II and again in 2020 because of the COVID-19 pandemic.

In 2022, the Pikes Peak or Bust Rodeo became the home of the NFR Open, formerly known as the National Circuit Finals Rodeo (NCFR).

References

External links
Official Website

Rodeos
Tourist attractions in El Paso County, Colorado
Culture of Colorado Springs, Colorado
ProRodeo Hall of Fame inductees
Events in Colorado Springs, Colorado